Fra' Annet de Clermot-Gessant (1587 – 2 June 1660) was the 59th Prince and Grand Master of the Order of Malta. He only reigned as Grandmaster of the Order in 1660. He was buried in the Chapel of Auvergne in St. John's Co-Cathedral.

External links
 Coins of Grandmaster Annet de Clermot-Gessant 

Grand Masters of the Knights Hospitaller
Knights of Malta
17th-century French military personnel
1587 births
1660 deaths
Burials at Saint John's Co-Cathedral